Anton Nikë Berisha (born 1946) is an Albanian scholar and folklorist. He has been teaching Albanian at the University of Calabria since 1992, and is considered an expert in Albanian oral and Arbëreshë literature.

Anton Berisha was born on August 7, 1946, in Mirash in the municipality of Klina in Kosovo. He went to school at Ujmir and Pristina. He studied Albanian language and literature at the University of Pristina. He finished his postgraduate studies at the University of Zagreb, where he earned his doctorate in 1981.

On July 1, 1973, Berisha was appointed to the department of folklore of the Albanological Institute of Pristina, where he worked for many years. In 1991 he moved to Italy and has been teaching Albanian at the University of Calabria since 1992.

Sources 

1946 births
Living people
Albanian folklorists
People from Klina
University of Pristina alumni
University of Zagreb alumni
Academic staff of the University of Calabria
Albanian academics
Albanian expatriates in Italy
Kosovo Albanians
Albanologists
Linguists from Kosovo